Pisania fasciculata is a species of sea snail, a marine gastropod mollusc in the family Pisaniidae, first described in 1846 by Lovell Augustus Reeve as Buccinum fasciculatum.

Description
The length of the shell attains 19.5 mm.

Distribution
This species occurs in the Indian Ocean off the Mascarene Basin; also off New Caledonia.

References

 Crosse, H., 1862 Journal de Conchyliologie, 10:
 Drivas, J. & Jay, M. (1987). Coquillages de La Réunion et de l'Île Maurice. Collection Les Beautés de la Nature. Delachaux et Niestlé: Neuchâtel. ISBN 2-603-00654-1. 159 pp. 
 Kilburn, R.N. & Rippey, E. (1982) Sea Shells of Southern Africa. Macmillan South Africa, Johannesburg, xi + 249 pp.
 Drivas, J.; Jay, M. (1987). Coquillages de La Réunion et de l'Île Maurice. Collection Les Beautés de la Nature. Delachaux et Niestlé: Neuchâtel. . 159 pp.
 Kilburn R.N., Marais J.P. & Fraussen K. (2010) Buccinidae. pp. 16–52, in: Marais A.P. & Seccombe A.D. (eds), Identification guide to the seashells of South Africa. Volume 1. Groenkloof: Centre for Molluscan Studies. 376 pp.

External links
 Reeve, L. A. (1846-1847). Monograph of the genus Buccinum. In: Conchologia Iconica, or, illustrations of the shells of molluscous animals, vol. 3, pl. 1-14 and unpaginated text. L. Reeve & Co., London.
 Adams, A. (1855). Descriptions of thirty-nine new species of shells, from the collection of Hugh Cuming, Esq. Proceedings of the Zoological Society of London. (1854) 22: 130-138, pl. 28
 Griffith E. & Pidgeon E. (1833-1834). The Mollusca and Radiata. Vol. 12, In: E. Griffith, [1824−1835, The Animal Kingdom arranged in conformity with its organization, by the Baron Cuvier, (...). London: Whittaker and Co., viii + 601 pp., 61 pls.]

Pisaniidae
Gastropods described in 1846
Taxa named by Lovell Augustus Reeve